It's Pat is a 1994 American slapstick comedy film directed by Adam Bernstein and starring Julia Sweeney, Dave Foley, Charles Rocket, and Kathy Griffin. The film was based on the Saturday Night Live (SNL) character Pat, created by Sweeney, an androgynous misfit whose sex is never revealed. Dave Foley plays Pat's partner Chris, and Charles Rocket, another SNL alumnus, plays Pat's neighbor Kyle.

The film was released in only thirty-three theatres in three cities in the United States. It's Pat was critically panned by critics, and bombed at the box-office, only grossing $60,822 against its $8 million budget.

Plot
Pat Riley is a chubby, whiny, and obnoxious job-hopper of indeterminate gender who is searching for a steady foundation in life. Pat falls in love with Chris (whose sex is also unrevealed to the audience) and the two get engaged. Meanwhile, Pat's neighbor Kyle develops an unhealthy obsession with identifying Pat's sex, and begins stalking them. He sends a tape of Pat performing karaoke to a TV show called America's Creepiest People, bringing them to the attention of the band Ween, who feature Pat in one of their performances, playing the tuba. When Pat learns that Ween intended to only use them for one gig, Pat and Chris break up.

Kyle steals Pat's laptop containing their diary and tries to coerce them into revealing the computer's password, so he can access the files. When Pat only answers that it's a word in the dictionary, Kyle begins manually trying every word in a dictionary. He eventually succeeds with the password "zythum" (an Egyptian malt beer), and reads the diary, but doesn't find the answer to his question, and finally snaps.

Meanwhile, a gang of thugs with the same goal begin harassing Pat, who becomes distraught over the thugs' androgynous nature. Pat complains to Kathy, a friend who is a therapist and host of a radio talk show. When Pat gives acerbic reactions to call-in listeners, the station fires Kathy and replaces her with Pat.

Kyle calls into Pat's radio show saying he has Pat's laptop, and sets up a meeting at the Ripley's Believe It or Not! Museum to retrieve it. Pat arrives to find Kyle dressed exactly like Pat. Kyle demands that Pat strip naked, but Pat runs off into a Ween concert. After Kyle corners them on a catwalk, Pat falls. Their pants get torn off by a hook and they are lowered with their genitalia exposed to the cheering concert  audience, but not to Kyle nor the viewer. Kyle is subsequently taken away by security guards. Pat then runs to see Chris, just as Chris is leaving on an ocean liner. In an epilogue, Pat and Chris marry.

During the end credits, Kathy is now hosting her radio show again and the first caller is Kyle, whose obsession with Pat has driven him to cross-dressing.

Cast
 Julia Sweeney as Pat Riley
 Dave Foley as Chris
 Charles Rocket as Kyle Jacobsen
 Kathy Griffin as herself
 Julie Hayden as Stacy Jacobsen
 Timothy Stack as Doctor
 Mary Scheer as Nurse
 Beverly Leech as Mrs. Riley
 Tim Meadows as KVIB-FM manager
 Phil LaMarr as Stage manager
 Larry Hankin as Postal supervisor
 Kathy Najimy as Tippy
 Jerry Tondo as Sushi chef
 Mitch Pileggi as Concert Guard
 Dean and Gene Ween as themselves

Production
The film was written by Sweeney, Jim Emerson (Sweeney's friend from their days with The Groundlings), and Sweeney's former husband Stephen Hibbert. While at the Groundlings, Emerson suggested that the character Pat, at the time a "character based on annoying co-workers who don't leave you alone", be made androgynous.

Three months before the film's release, Sweeney commented on her initial reluctance to do a film based on Pat:

I resisted it completely. I just didn't know how we could make it last for two hours. But 20th Century Fox was really keen; our producer was really keen. So we thought, OK, we'll write the script. And after three months, we fell madly in love with the script. Unfortunately, Fox did not.

Touchstone Pictures decided to produce the film, after Fox bowed out.

Quentin Tarantino revealed that he was an uncredited writer on the script.

Reception
It's Pat has a rare 0% rating on Rotten Tomatoes, based on 11 reviews.

Variety magazine called the film "shockingly unfunny", noting that Sweeney had "perversely turned the relatively harmless TV character into a boorish, egotistical creep for the bigscreen", the film's "only really funny bit is Sexual Personae author Camille Paglia, deftly parodying herself, commenting on the significance of Pat's androgyny". Kevin Thomas of the Los Angeles Times wrote: "It's Pat offers a simple message of self-acceptance, asserting that what counts is who you are rather than what your gender may or may not be. The trouble is that its telling is truly terrible." TV Guide called it "yet another tepid film comedy based on a recurring Saturday Night Live sketch". They conclude "the story goes nowhere, and if the film ran longer than its 80 minutes, it would have become too tedious to tolerate".

The film opened in only three cities (33 theaters). Its total gross was $60,822. As a result, the film was pulled from theaters after its opening weekend.

Accolades
 It's Pat was a multiple third place nominee at the 16th Golden Raspberry Awards, though the film's cast and crew lost in every category to Showgirls: 
 Worst Actress - Julia Sweeney
 Worst New Star - Julia Sweeney
 Worst Picture - Charles B. Wessler
 Worst Screen Couple - Dave Foley and Julia Sweeney
 Worst Screenplay - Jim Emerson, Stephen Hibbert, and Julia Sweeney

At the 1995 Stinkers Bad Movie Awards, the film was nominated for Worst Picture but lost to Showgirls. However, Julia Sweeney did win Worst Actress for this film. Later, the Stinkers released their user-constructed "100 Years, 100 Stinkers" list in which visitors determined the 100 worst movies of the 20th century. It's Pat ranked in the bottom 20 at #7.

Soundtrack
No soundtrack album was released. The songs from It's Pat are listed below as shown within the film's credits:
 "It's Pat Theme" - Christina Zander, Julia Sweeney, Cheryl Hardwick
 "Walz Pompadour" (written by Tom Elliot)
 "Poem of Crickets" (written by 長沢 勝俊 (Katsutoshi Nagasawa)) 
 "Delta Swelter" - Gary Fletcher, Paul Jones, Dave Kelly, Tom McGuinness, Bob Townsend
 "The Cool Look" - Johnny Hawksworth
 "Brain Women" - Mark Mothersbaugh
 "Everybody Loves Somebody" - Julia Sweeney
 "Dude (Looks Like a Lady)" - Aerosmith
 "Le Freak" - Julia Sweeney
 "Paero" - Phillippe Lhommt, Jacques Mercier
 "Pork Roll, Egg and Cheese" - Ween
 "How's It Gonna Be" - The Dead Milkmen
 "Bring It to Me" - Collective Thoughts
 "Don't Get 2 Close (2 My Fantasy)" - Ween
 "You're the Best Thing That Ever Happened to Me" - Gladys Knight & the Pips

References

External links

 
 
 
 

Saturday Night Live films
Saturday Night Live in the 1990s
1995 films
1994 comedy films
1994 films
American comedy films
American independent films
American satirical films
Androgyny
Films based on television series
Films set in Los Angeles
Films shot in Los Angeles
Touchstone Pictures films
Films scored by Mark Mothersbaugh
American LGBT-related films
1994 directorial debut films
1990s English-language films
1994 independent films
1990s American films